Swampsong is the third studio album by the Finnish melodic death metal band Kalmah. This is the last album with Pasi Hiltula on keyboards.

Track listing
All lyrics are written by Pekka Kokko

Credits

Band members
 Pekka Kokko − guitar, vocals
 Antti Kokko − guitar
 Pasi Hiltula − keyboard
 Timo Lehtinen − bass guitar
 Janne Kusmin − drums

Production
 Recorded by Ahti Kortelainen at Tico-Tico Studios, Kemi, in February 2003.
 Mixed by Mikko Karmila at Finnvox Studios in March 2003.
 Mastered by Mika Jussila at Finnvox Studios in March 2003.

References

Kalmah albums
2003 albums
Spinefarm Records albums